This is the complete list of Asian Games medalists in sambo on 2018.

Men

52 kg

90 kg

Women

48 kg

69 kg

References

External links 
Sambo Results Book

Martial arts

medalists